India participated in the 2010 Asian Games in Guangzhou, China between 12–27 November 2010. The contingent was led by Gagan Narang. India put up its best ever performance at Asian Games. They finished the games at 65 medals including 14 golds which is India's second best performance ever since inception of Asian Games in 1951. These games also witnessed first ever medals in Gymnastics and Roller Sports.

Medal summary

Medal table

Multiple medalists

Medalists
(vs 2006 Legends:: •: Debut, ↔: Defends, ↑: Improves, ↓: Down)

Gold

Silver

Bronze

Archery

Men

Women

Athletics

Men 

Track events

* Participated in the heats only.

Field events

Road events

Combined events

Women 

Track events

Field events

Combined events

Badminton

Men

Women
Freestyle

Wushu

Men
Changquan

Nanquan\Nangun

Taijiquan\Taijijian

Sanda

Women
Changquan

Sanda

References

Nations at the 2010 Asian Games
2010
Asian Games